Wamala is a surname. Notable people with the surname include: 

Elly Wamala (1935–2004), Ugandan musician
Emmanuel Wamala (born 1926), Ugandan Catholic cardinal
Florence Nambozo Wamala (born 1975), Ugandan politician
Katumba Wamala (born 1956), Ugandan general

See also
Lake Wamala, a freshwater lake in Uganda